Lluxita (Aymara lluxi shell of a mussel; landslide, -ta a suffix, also spelled Llojeta) is a mountain in the Bolivian Andes which reaches a height of approximately . It is located in the La Paz Department, Loayza Province,  Luribay Municipality. Lluxita lies northwest of Jach'a Walluni and Turini, east of the village of Capilla Santa Cruz. The Malla Jawira flows along its slopes.

References 

Mountains of La Paz Department (Bolivia)